Tridactylus is a genus of pygmy mole crickets, with species recorded from Africa, India, Indo-China and Australia.

Species
The Orthoptera Species File lists:
Tridactylus angustus Günther, 1995
Tridactylus australicus Mjoberg, 1913
Tridactylus berlandi Chopard, 1920
Tridactylus bijakherensis Gupta, Shi & Chandra, 2018
Tridactylus fossor Fabricius, 1798
Tridactylus major Scudder, 1869
Tridactylus paradoxus Latreille, 1802 - type species (locality Dieke, Guinea)
Tridactylus thoracicus Guérin-Méneville, 1844
Tridactylus tithonus Blackith & Blackith, 1979

Note: species such as T. capensis and T. peruvianus Chopard, previously placed here, are now in similar genera such as Ellipes and Xya.

References

External links

Cedarcreek.umn.edu: Tridactylus sp.

Tridactylidae
Orthoptera genera